Choma District is a district of Zambia, located in Southern Province. The capital lies at Choma. As of the 2000 Zambian Census, the district had a population of 74,890 people. Choma is now the provincial capital of the Southern Province of Zambia and has since been split into two districts giving birth to Pemba district on the Northern border of the district.

References

 
Districts of Southern Province, Zambia